Perlich may refer to:

 Perlich (Germanic)
 Perlich (Slavic)
 Martin Perlich - radio broadcaster and writer
 Max Perlich - actor, son of Martin Perlich